Silvia Parera Carrau (born 5 September 1969 in Mataró, Catalonia) is a former medley and breaststroke swimmer from Spain, who competed at three consecutive Summer Olympics for her native country, starting in 1988 in Seoul, South Korea. 

Her clubs were CN Premià, CN Mataró, CN Sant Andreu, CN Catalunya and CN Mediterrani.

References
 Spanish Olympic Committee

1969 births
Living people
People from Mataró
Sportspeople from the Province of Barcelona
Spanish female breaststroke swimmers
Spanish female medley swimmers
Olympic swimmers of Spain
Swimmers at the 1988 Summer Olympics
Swimmers at the 1992 Summer Olympics
Swimmers at the 1996 Summer Olympics
European Aquatics Championships medalists in swimming
Mediterranean Games silver medalists for Spain
Mediterranean Games medalists in swimming
Swimmers at the 1991 Mediterranean Games
Swimmers from Catalonia
20th-century Spanish women